A wrench or spanner  is a tool used to provide grip and mechanical advantage in applying torque to turn objects—usually rotary fasteners, such as nuts and bolts—or keep them from turning.

In the UK, Ireland, Australia, and New Zealand spanner is the standard term. The most common shapes are called open-ended spanner and ring spanner. The term wrench is generally used for tools that turn non-fastening devices (e.g. tap wrench and pipe wrench), or may be used for a monkey wrench—an adjustable pipe wrench.

In North American English, wrench is the standard term. The most common shapes are called open-end wrench and box-end wrench. In American English, spanner refers to a specialized wrench with a series of pins or tabs around the circumference. (These pins or tabs fit into the holes or notches cut into the object to be turned.) In American commerce, such a wrench may be called a spanner wrench to distinguish it from the British sense of spanner.

Higher quality wrenches are typically made from chromium-vanadium alloy tool steels and are often drop-forged. They are frequently chrome-plated to resist corrosion and for ease of cleaning.

Hinged tools, such as pliers or tongs, are not generally considered wrenches in English, but exceptions are the plumber wrench (pipe wrench in British English) and Mole wrench (sometimes Mole grips in British English).

The word can also be used in slang to describe an unexpected obstacle, for example, "He threw a spanner in the works" (in U.S. English, "monkey wrench").

Etymology

'Wrench' is derived from Middle English wrench, from Old English wrenċ, from Proto-Germanic *wrankiz ("a turning, twisting"). First used in 1790.

'Spanner' came into use in the 1630s, referring to the tool for winding the spring of a wheel-lock firearm. From German Spanner (n.), from spannen (v.) ("to join, fasten, extend, connect"), from Proto-Germanic *spannan, from PIE root *(s)pen- ("to draw, stretch, spin").

History
Wrenches and applications using wrenches or devices that needed wrenches, such as pipe clamps and suits of armor, have been noted by historians as far back as the 15th century. Adjustable coach wrenches for the odd-sized nuts of wagon wheels were manufactured in England and exported to North America in the late eighteenth and early nineteenth centuries. The mid 19th century began to see patented wrenches that used a screw for narrowing and widening the jaws, including patented monkey wrenches.

Most box end wrenches are sold as 12-point because 12-point wrenches fit over both 12-point and 6-point bolts. 12-point wrenches also offer a higher number of engagement points over 6-point. However, 12-point wrenches have been known to round off 6-point bolts as they provide less contact space.

Types

Other types of keys
These types of keys are not emically classified as wrenches by English speakers, but they are etically similar in function to wrenches.

Size designations

Size is usually designated by dimensions such as across-flats distance (inscribed-hexagon size). In the 19th and early 20th centuries, it had been common to define the nominal size of the wrench according to the nominal size of the screw thread that it was meant to be used with. Modern practice uses a size designation based on across-flats distance, whether measured in metric or in inch units.

See also
 List of screw drives

References

External links
 
 
  Spanner for Nuremberg hunting wheel-lock pistol c1610 with matching powder flask and built-in key (half-way down page)
 Spanner Jaw Sizes  Additional background information and spanner jaw size table.
 Conversion chart Whitworth/BSF/AF and metric spanner and thread sizes
 ER Type Hook Wrenches

Metalworking hand tools
Woodworking hand tools
 
Metallic objects